The 1967 season in Swedish football, starting April 1967 and ending November 1967:

Honours

Official titles

Notes

References 
Online

 
Seasons in Swedish football